Convent of the Sacred Heart may refer to:

Convent of the Sacred Heart (Connecticut), Greenwich, Connecticut
Convent of the Sacred Heart (New York), New York, New York
 Convent of the Sacred Heart High School (British Columbia), Vancouver, British Columbia
 Convent of the Sacred Heart High School (California), San Francisco, California
 Convent of the Sacred Heart, Brighton, now Cardinal Newman Catholic School, Hove
Convent of the Sacred Heart National Primary School, Melaka

See also
Sacred Heart school (disambiguation)
Sacred Heart (disambiguation)